The Parliament of the Cayman Islands is the unicameral legislature of the British Overseas Territory of the Cayman Islands. It is composed of 21 members; 19 elected members for a four-year term and two members ex officio.

The Governor may at any time, by Proclamation, prorogue or dissolve the Parliament. The Governor shall dissolve the Parliament at the expiration of four years from the date when the Parliament first meets after any general election unless it has been sooner dissolved. There shall be a general election at such time within two months after every dissolution of the Parliament as the Governor shall, by Proclamation, appoint. The first meeting of every session of the House shall, by Proclamation, be held on such day as the Governor shall appoint. A session usually consists of four meetings. A Meeting comprises several sittings.

In the elections of 8 November 2000, with a turnout of 80% only non-partisans were elected. After the election, conservative members of parliament formed the United Democratic Party. The conservative social democratic People's Progressive Movement formed in response and won the subsequent election. The United Democratic Party has since collapsed, with former members either exiting politics or becoming independents.

History
The first meeting to discuss the possible legislative future of the Cayman Islands took place on 5 December 1831 at Pedro St. James Castle, a great house in the fertile area of Savannah on Grand Cayman. This building is the seat of parliamentary beginnings in the Cayman Islands.

By 1909 what got established as the Legislative Assembly of Justices and Vestry was meeting in the Court House on the waterfront in what is now the headquarters of the Cayman Islands National Museum, in front of Hog Sty Bay and the cruise passenger arrival terminal. The building served as the seat of government, the court house and the legislature. Now it is the home of the Cayman Islands National Museum.

The present Parliament building was built on the site of the former Princess Royal Park. The building design was the subject of some controversy when selected as the winner of an international architectural competition. Being the first poured concrete public building in Cayman, modern techniques were not yet in use, so the concrete was mixed on the street and poured pail by pail by a bucket brigade. The cornerstone was laid by Captain Rayal Brazly Bodden, MBE, JP, on 29 September 1971. The building was completed in July 1972.
 
By 2003, the legislature had outgrown the space and the building was in need of renovating. Repair and refurbishment work on the building began in February 2003, which added more space through reconfiguration, and renovated and refurbished portions of the interior, including the main chamber.

The newly refurbished and expanded building was inaugurated with the opening of the Legislature session on 2 July 2004, two months before Hurricane Ivan, which almost completely devastated Grand Cayman over a two-day period (11–12 September 2004). The LA building withstood the storm with minor damage to its roof.

Nineteen members (Members of the Parliament, MPs) are currently elected on a "one person, one vote" basis, following a Constitution Order in 2015. This replaced the electoral system form the 2009 constitutional amendment (where 18 members were elected from five multi- and two single-member constituencies). The two ex officio (appointed) members, the Deputy Governor and the Attorney-General, are appointed by the Governor of the Cayman Islands.

On 3 December 2020, the Legislative Assembly of the Cayman Islands was renamed the Parliament of the Cayman Islands by the Cayman Islands Constitution (Amendment) Order 2020.

Official Members
Hon. Franz Manderson, MBE: Deputy Governor; First Official Member, Responsible for External Affairs
Hon. Samuel W. Bulgin, JP, QC: Attorney General; Second Official Member, Responsible for Legal Affairs

Elected Members

Speaker of the Parliament of the Cayman Islands

Cabinet Ministers

Backbenchers

Opposition

Official Opposition Members

Results
2021 Cayman Islands general election

See also
List of speakers of the Legislative Assembly of the Cayman Islands

References

External links
 

Government of the Cayman Islands
Cayman Islands
Cayman Islands